Luka Nakov (Bulgarian and ; born 14 January 2000) is a Bulgarian-Macedonian footballer who last played as a goalkeeper for Bromley.

Career

Slavia
On 19 April 2018 Nakov was included in the group for the league match against Cherno More on 20 April 2018. He made his professional debut for the team in that match coming as a substitute in the 60th minute after Emanuele Geria got injured. In February 2019, Nakov was an unused substitute for Bromley against Maidstone United.

Career statistics

Club

References

External links
 

2000 births
Living people
Footballers from Skopje
Association football goalkeepers
Bulgarian footballers
Macedonian footballers
PFC Slavia Sofia players
Bromley F.C. players
First Professional Football League (Bulgaria) players
Expatriate footballers in England
Macedonian expatriate sportspeople in England